Byltsyno is a rural locality (a village) in Denisovskoye Rural Settlement, Gorokhovetsky District, Vladimir Oblast, Russia. The population was 1 as of 2010.

Geography 
Byltsyno is located on the Vazhnya River, 23 km southwest of Gorokhovets (the district's administrative centre) by road. Otvodnoye is the nearest rural locality.

References 

Rural localities in Gorokhovetsky District